Simon Corcoran is a British ancient historian and lecturer in ancient history within the School of History, Classics and Archaeology, Newcastle University.

Corcoran was a senior research fellow at University College, London from 1999 to 2015. He received his D.Phil. from St John's College, Oxford in 1992. He was awarded the Henryk Kupiszewski Prize for his book The Empire of the Tetrarchs in 1998. At University College he worked on 'Projet Volterra', an extensive on-line public database of law (Roman, Germanic or ‘barbarian’, and ecclesiastical) for the period AD193–900.

From 2014 Corcoran has been a member of the Steering Committee of the British Epigraphy Society. He is a Consulting Editor for the Journal of Late Antiquity and a Scientific Advisor for Revue Antiquité tardive. From 2006 to 2009 he served on the Council of the Society for the Promotion of Hellenic Studies and on the council for the British Institute at Ankara from 2011 to 2015.

In 2016 Corcoran was a member of the panel for BBC Radio 4's In Our Time episode on Justinian's Legal Code with Caroline Humfress and Paul du Plessis.

Gregorian Code discovery

In 2010 the Volterra database was used by Corcoran and Salway to  identify previously unknown fragments of the Gregorian Code. The "Fragmenta Londiniensia" are seventeen pieces of parchment estimated to date from AD400, the document having been cut up and re-used as book-binding material. This is the  first direct evidence yet discovered of the Gregorian Codex.

Bibliography of works

Books

Selected publications

See also
 Professor Michael Crawford
 Benet Salway

Footnotes

External links
 Volterra Project at UCL (2008 archive version)
 Bryn Mawr Classical Review 97.8.4 Review of The Empire of the Tetrarchs
 

Alumni of St John's College, Oxford
Alumni of Christ Church, Oxford
People associated with the History Department, University College London
Members of the Society for the Promotion of Hellenic Studies
1960 births
Living people
British historians
Classical scholars of Newcastle University